William Brindley (born December 25, 1982 in Oklahoma City, Oklahoma) is a former American soccer player.

Career

College and Amateur
Brindley played college soccer at Palm Beach Atlantic University from 2003 to 2006. During his college years he also played with the Palm Beach Pumas in the USL Premier Development League.

Professional
Brindley turned professional in 2008, playing with the Real Maryland Monarchs, and scored 3 goals in 8 games for the team before transferring to the Pittsburgh Riverhounds for the  2009 season.

External links
Riverhounds bio

References

1982 births
Living people
American soccer players
Palm Beach Pumas players
Pittsburgh Riverhounds SC players
Real Maryland F.C. players
USL League Two players
USL Second Division players
Association football forwards